Arthur Wayland Ellison (1899–1994) was an actor and director who worked for the Kansas City Power and Light Company for forty-eight years before becoming a professional actor. Prior to that, he had appeared in scores of amateur stage productions in the Kansas City area. He was born in Potsdam, New York and he died in Kansas City, Missouri. Director Herk Harvey speculated that Art Ellison had acted in more industrial and educational films than any other actor in the US, including some directed by a young Robert Altman. He is best known for his part in the 1962 cult-classic horror film Carnival of Souls.

Filmography

References

External links
 

American male actors
American directors
People from Potsdam, New York
1899 births
1994 deaths